Ghiasabad (also Romanized as Ghīās̄ābād and Gheyās̄ābād) is a village in Sofla Rural District, in the Central District of Kharameh County, Fars Province, Iran. At the 2006 census, its population was 104, in 24 families.

References 

Populated places in Kharameh County